Albania (ALB) competed at the 2005 Mediterranean Games in Almería, Spain with a total number of 58 participants (35 men and 23 women).

Medals

Silver
 Weightlifting
Men's – 85 kg (Snatch): Ilirian Suli
Women's – 53 kg (Clean&Jerk): Fetie Kasaj

Bronze
 Athletics
Women's 400 metres: Klodiana Shala

 Weightlifting
Women's – 58 kg (Snatch): Romela Begaj
Men's – 62 kg (Clean&Jerk): Gert Trasha
Men's – 85 kg (Clean&Jerk): Ilirian Suli

Results by event
 Athletics
Women's 400 metres
 Klodiana Shala

 Boxing
Men's Flyweight (– 51 kg)
 Artur Gavoçeja
Men's Welterweight (– 69 kg)
 Artur Muedini
Men's Super Heavyweight (+ 91 kg)
 Nelson Hysa

 Rowing
Women's Single Sculls
Ilda Theka

 Swimming
Men's Competition
David Alliu
Malbor Oshafi
Klajd Vrahoriti
Women's Competition
Tiziana Jakova
Rovena Marku

 Volleyball
Men's Team Competition
Dritan Çuko
Bledar Doçi
Arben Dunisha
Klodian Ferhati
Altin Gorenxa
Aurel Kaja
Klodian Kasa
Naim Limanaj
Genti Lundra
Roland Tarja
Elton Tukseferi
Enea Xhelati
Women's Team Competition
Marsela Çalleku
Denisa Çarçani
Lapardhoti Dorina
Merlin Fagu
Anila Hoxha
Edlira Huqi
Geralda Neli
Amarilda Prenga
Jonida Sallaku
Kleda Shkurti
Jonida Shollo
Rubena Sukaj

See also
 Albania at the 2004 Summer Olympics
 Albania at the 2008 Summer Olympics

References
 Official Site
 swimrankings
 juegosmediterraneos

Nations at the 2005 Mediterranean Games
2005
Mediterranean Games